NBN Co Limited, known as simply nbn, is a publicly owned corporation of the Australian Government, tasked to design, build and operate Australia's National Broadband Network as the nation's wholesale broadband provider. The corporation reports to two shareholder ministers: the Minister for Finance and the Minister for Communications.

History
NBN Co was established on  under the name of its company number, "A.C.N. 136 533 741 Limited". After the establishment, the Australian Government started referring to the company as "National Broadband Network Company", which became the de facto company name. It traded as "NBN Co" until 26 April 2015 when it began trading simply as "nbn".

In 2019, NBN Co announced that by May 2020 retail service providers will be able to pool all their connectivity virtual circuit (CVC) bandwidth nationally.

In February 2020, the company announced that 6.7 million homes and businesses were connected to a plan over the nbn access network – compared with 4.9 million in February 2019.

NBN and retail service providers
As a wholesale provider of broadband access through its level two networks, NBN provides broadband access predominantly to retail service providers (RSPs); these businesses on sell access to end users; both residential and business customers to access the internet.

At 30 June 2016, Telstra had 45.5%, TPG group had 24.8% and Optus had 12.4% of all end users connecting to the NBN.

There has been a significant failure of the NBN to deliver nominal performance to end users. There has been contention between RSPs and NBN on the reasons for this. Bill Morrow, then CEO of NBN, admitted in 2017 that 15% of end users received a poor service through the NBN and were 'seriously dissatisfied'. In addition, Morrow indicated that, at July 2017, prices and performance for end users were suppressed through a 'price war' between RSPs.

Contractual arrangements
NBN contracts mainly with RSPs to provide wholesale broadband access, with limited supply of backhaul to other organisations (for example providing backhaul services to Vodafone).

National Broadband Network

Under the Gillard/Rudd governments' NBN Co corporate plan, it was estimated that the NBN construction would require A$27.5 billion in government equity and raise an estimated A$13.4 billion in debt funding without government support; a total funding requirement of A$40.9 billion up to FY2021. Financial forecasts for NBN Co assuming a 7% internal rate of return (IRR) expect the government and debt equity will be fully repaid including accrued interest by FY2040. Following the election of the Abbott government, NBN Co reassessed financial forecasts and progress of the NBN roll-out and published a strategic review in December 2013.

In response to what the Abbott/Turnbull governments stated to be excessive performance specifications and costs they moved from a model which previously focused on FTTP (fibre to the premises) to a multi-technology mix model using FTTx, including FTTP, FTTN (fibre to the node), FTTB (fibre to the building or basement) and most recently FTTdp (fibre to the distribution point); and HFC (hybrid fibre coaxial) in metropolitan areas. Regional and remote areas were mainly unchanged as a result of the strategic review and typically receive a service using either fixed wireless, using LTE technology, or satellite.

The NBN network, at 2022, draws together wired communication (copper, optical and hybrid fibre-coaxial) and radio communication (satellite and fixed wireless networks) at 121 points of interconnect typically located in Telstra owned telephone exchanges throughout Australia. It also sells access for mobile telecommunication backhaul to mobile telecommunications providers.

NBN Co has stated that there is no significant demand for wired connections above 25 Mbit/s and consideration of upgrading the network will not be undertaken until demand for high-bandwidth services is proven.

In August 2019, Stephen Rue (CEO), announced the completion of the $51 billion National Broadband Network by June 2020.... However, some service areas were still being rolled out in late 2020/2021 with FTTP to FTTN/FTTC premises.

Corporate structure
Below is the management structure of NBN Co at 30 September 2022

Board
 Kate McKenzie – Chair
 Stephen Rue - Managing Director & Chief Executive Officer from 18 September 2018 (Chief Financial Officer from July 2014 until appointment as MD)
 Drew Clarke – Non-executive director (from 22 August 2017 for a three-year term)
 Pam Bains – Non-executive director
 Nerida Caesar – Non-executive director
 Michael Malone – Non-executive director (from 20 April 2016)
 Andrew Dix – Non-executive director
 Nicole Lockwood – Non-executive director 
 Elisha Parker – Non-executive director

Former directors
 Bill Morrow – Managing Director & Chief Executive Officer to 18 September 2018
 Mike Quigley – Interim Chairman and a director of NBN Co 24 July 2009 – 15 March 2010, Director 15 March 2010 – 3 October 2013.
 Simon Hackett – Non-executive director     
 Alison Lansley – Non-executive director 
 Shirley In't Veld – Non-executive director
 Zoe McKenzie – Non-executive director
 Dr Kerry Schott AO – Non-executive director

Employees

By December 2018 the company had 6,850 employees and temporary staff

Annual Report 2020 Work force statistics staff 6,200 employees and contractors page 32

Annual Report 2021 Work force statistics staff 4,951 employees and contractors page 187

References

External links 

 of NBN Co
About NBN Co 

 
National Broadband Network
Internet service providers of Australia
Telecommunications companies of Australia
Commonwealth Government-owned companies of Australia
Companies based in Melbourne
Telecommunications companies established in 2009
2009 establishments in Australia
Government-owned telecommunications companies